The following elections occurred in the year 2007.

 Electoral calendar 2007
 Elections in 2007
 2007 United Nations Security Council election

Africa
 52nd National Conference of the African National Congress
 2007 Algerian legislative election
 2007 Beninese parliamentary election
 2007 Burkinabé parliamentary election
 2007 Cameroonian parliamentary election
 2007 Democratic Republic of the Congo gubernatorial elections
 2007 Democratic Republic of the Congo Senate election
 2007 Republic of the Congo parliamentary election
 2007 Egyptian Shura Council election
 2007 Egyptian constitutional referendum
 2007 Ethiopian presidential election
 2007 Gambian parliamentary election
 2007 Kenyan general election
 2007 Lesotho general election
 2007 Malagasy parliamentary election
 2007 Malian parliamentary election
 2007 Malian presidential election
 2007 Mauritanian Senate election
 2007 Mauritanian presidential election
 2007 Moroccan parliamentary election
 2007 Nigerian general election
 2007 Senegalese Senate election
 2007 Senegalese parliamentary election
 2007 Senegalese presidential election
 2007 Seychellois parliamentary election
 2007 Sierra Leonean general election
 2007 Togolese parliamentary election

Asia
 2007 Armenian parliamentary election
 2007–2008 Bhutanese National Council election
 2007 East Timorese presidential election
 2007 East Timorese parliamentary election
 2007 Hong Kong Chief Executive election
 2007 Hong Kong Island by-election
 2007 Indian presidential election
 2007 Israeli presidential election
 Jordanian parliamentary election results, 2007
 2007 Jordanian parliamentary election
 2007 Kazakhstani legislative election
 2007 Kuomintang chairmanship election
 2007 Kyrgyzstani constitutional referendum
 2007 Kyrgyzstani parliamentary election
 2007 Labor Party (Israel) leadership election
 2007 Lebanese by-elections
 2007 Nagorno-Karabakh presidential election
 2007 Omani parliamentary election
 2007 Pakistani presidential election
 2007 Philippine House of Representatives elections
 2007 Philippine Senate election
 2007 Philippine general election
 2007 Qatari municipal elections
 2007 South Korean presidential election
 2007 Syrian parliamentary election
 2007 Syrian presidential election
 2007 Thai general election
 2007 Thai constitutional referendum
 2007 Turkmenistan presidential election
 2007 Uzbekistani presidential election
 2007 Vietnamese parliamentary election
 2007 Vietnamese presidential election

India
 2007 Goa Legislative Assembly election
 2007 Gujarat Legislative Assembly election
 2007 Himachal Pradesh Legislative Assembly election
 2007 Indian presidential election
 2007 Punjab Legislative Assembly election
 2007 Uttar Pradesh Legislative Assembly election
 2007 Uttarakhand Legislative Assembly election

Japan
 2007 Chuo mayoral election
 2007 Fukagawa mayoral by-election
 2007 Fukuoka gubernatorial election
 2007 Higashiōsaka city assembly election
 2007 Inagi local election
 2007 Japanese House of Councillors election
 2007 Kameoka mayoral election
 2007 Komae city assembly election
 2007 Liberal Democratic Party (Japan) leadership election
 2007 Meguro local election
 2007 Minamimaki mayoral election
 2007 Miyazaki gubernatorial by-election
 2007 Miyota mayoral election
 2007 Mukō city assembly election
 2007 Ōta local election
 2007 Results of the Japanese House of Councillors election
 2007 Rikuzentakata mayoral election
 2007 Saitama gubernatorial election
 2007 Shinagawa city assembly election
 2007 Shinjuku local election
 2007 Tokyo gubernatorial election
 2007 Warabi city assembly election
 2007 Warabi mayoral election

Malaysia
 2007 Batu Talam by-election
 2007 Ijok by-election
 2007 Machap by-election

Philippines
 2007 Cebu City local elections
 2007 Pasig local elections
 2007 Davao City general elections
 2007 Davao del Norte general elections
 2007 Philippine House of Representatives elections
 2007 Philippine Senate election
 2007 Philippine barangay and Sangguniang Kabataan elections
 2007 Philippine general election

Russia
 2007 Chechen constitutional referendum
 2007 Russian legislative election
 2007 Volgograd mayoral election

Turkey
 2007 Turkish general election
 2007 Turkish presidential election
 2007 Turkish constitutional referendum

Europe
 2007 Abkhazian parliamentary election
 2007 Åland legislative election
 2007 Albanian presidential election
 2007 Albanian local elections
 2007 Belgian general election
 2007 Croatian parliamentary election
 2007 Danish parliamentary election
 2007 Estonian parliamentary election
 European Parliament election, 2007 (Romania)
 2007 European Parliament election
 European Parliament election, 2007 (Bulgaria)
 2007 Finnish parliamentary election
 2007 Gibraltar general election
 2007 Greek legislative election
 2007 Icelandic parliamentary election
 2007 Irish general election
 2007 Jersey constable election
 2007 Kosovan parliamentary election
 2007 Kosovan local elections
 2007 Latvian presidential election
 2007 Maltese local council elections
 2007 Moldovan local election
 2007 Nagorno-Karabakh presidential election
 2007 Norwegian local elections
 2007 Panhellenic Socialist Movement leadership election
 2007 Polish parliamentary election
 2007 Republika Srpska presidential election
 2007 Romanian voting system referendum
 2007 Romanian presidential impeachment referendum
 2007 Serbian parliamentary election
 2007 Slovenian presidential election
 2007 Turkish general election
 2007 Turkish constitutional referendum
 2007 Ukrainian parliamentary election

Austria
 2007 Burgenland local elections
 2007 Krems local election

European Parliament
 2007 European Parliament election
 European Parliament election, 2007 (Bulgaria)
 European Parliament election, 2007 (Romania)

France
 2007 French presidential election
 2007 French legislative election
 2007 Saint Barthélemy Territorial Council election
 2007 Saint Martin Territorial Council election

Germany
 2007 Bremen state election

Italy
 2008 Abruzzo regional election
 2008 Friuli-Venezia Giulia regional election
 Italian Senate election in Lombardy, 2008
 2008 Italian general election
 Italian general election, 2008 (Aosta Valley)
 Italian general election, 2008 (Friuli-Venezia Giulia)
 Italian general election, 2008 (Piedmont)
 Italian general election, 2008 (Sardinia)
 Italian general election, 2008 (Sicily)
 Italian general election, 2008 (Trentino-Alto Adige/Südtirol)
 Italian general election, 2008 (Veneto)
 2008 Sicilian regional election
 2008 Trentino-Alto Adige/Südtirol provincial elections
 2008 Valdostan regional election
 2007 Democratic Party (Italy) leadership election

Netherlands
 2007 Dutch Senate election
 2007 Dutch provincial elections

Russia
 2007 Chechen constitutional referendum
 2007 Russian legislative election
 2007 Volgograd mayoral election

Spain
 Elections to the Aragonese Corts, 2007
 Elections to the Corts Valencianes, 2007
 2007 Spanish regional elections

Switzerland
 2007 Swiss federal election
 2007 Swiss Federal Council election
 2007 Grand Council of Vaud election

Turkey
 2007 Turkish general election
 2007 Turkish presidential election
 2007 Turkish constitutional referendum

United Kingdom
 2007 Ealing Southall by-election
 2007 Inverclyde Council election
 2007 Labour Party deputy leadership election
 2007 Labour Party (UK) leadership election
 2007 Liberal Democrats leadership election
 2007 United Kingdom local elections
 2007 Northern Ireland Assembly election
 2007 Scottish Parliament election
 2007 Sedgefield by-election
 2007 Timeline for the Labour Party (UK) leadership elections

United Kingdom local
 2007 United Kingdom local elections
 United Kingdom local elections, 2007/Metropolitan boroughs
 United Kingdom local elections, 2007/Unitary boroughs
 United Kingdom local elections, 2007/District councils
 2007 Scottish local elections
 2003 Scottish local elections

English local
 2007 Allerdale Council election
 2007 Alnwick Council election
 2007 Amber Valley Council election
 2007 Arun Council election
 2007 Ashfield Council election
 2007 Ashford Council election
 2007 Aylesbury Vale Council election
 2007 Babergh Council election
 2007 Barrow-in-Furness Council election
 2007 Bassetlaw Council election
 2007 Blackburn with Darwen Council election
 2007 Blackpool Council election
 2007 Bolton Council election
 2007 Boston Borough Council elections
 2007 Brentwood Council election
 2007 Brighton and Hove City Council election
 2007 Broxbourne Council election
 2007 Burnley Council election
 2007 Calderdale Council election
 2007 Cherwell Council election
 2007 Chichester Council election
 2007 Chorley Council election
 2007 Corby Borough Council elections
 2007 Coventry Council election
 2007 Craven Council election
 2007 Dacorum Council election
 2007 Dartford Council election
 2007 Daventry Council election
 2007 Derby Council election
 2007 Eastleigh Council election
 2007 Ellesmere Port and Neston Council election
 2007 Epping Forest Council election
 2007 Fylde Council election
 2007 Halton Council election
 2007 Harlow Council election
 2007 Hart Council election
 2007 Hull Council election
 2007 Hyndburn Council election
 2007 Ipswich Borough Council election
 2007 Kettering Borough Council elections
 2007 Knowsley Council election
 2007 Liverpool Council election
 2007 Macclesfield Council election
 2007 Manchester Council election
 2007 Mole Valley Council election
 2007 Newcastle-under-Lyme Council election
 2007 North Lincolnshire Council election
 2007 North Tyneside Council election
 2007 Northampton Council election
 2007 Penwith Council election
 2007 Portsmouth Council election
 2007 Preston Council election
 2007 Purbeck Council election
 2007 Redditch Council election
 2007 Rochdale Council election
 2007 Rochford Council election
 2007 Rossendale Council election
 2007 Runnymede Council election
 2007 Rushmoor Council election
 2007 Ryedale Council election
 2007 Salford Council election
 2007 Scarborough Council election
 2007 Sedgefield Council election
 2007 Sheffield Council election
 2007 Shepway Council election
 2007 Slough Council election
 2007 South Lakeland Council election
 2007 South Ribble Council election
 2007 Southend-on-Sea Council election
 2007 St Albans Council election
 2007 St Helens Council election
 2007 Stevenage Council election
 2007 Stockport Council election
 2007 Stratford-on-Avon Council election
 2007 Surrey Heath Council election
 2007 Swindon Council election
 2007 Tameside Council election
 2007 Tamworth Council election
 2007 Tandridge Council election
 2007 Three Rivers Council election
 2007 Thurrock Council election
 2007 Trafford Council election
 2007 Tunbridge Wells Council election
 2007 Tynedale Council election
 2007 Vale of White Horse Council election
 2007 Wakefield Council election
 2007 Warwick Council election
 2007 Watford Council election
 2007 Welwyn Hatfield Council election
 2007 West Lancashire Council election
 2007 West Lindsey Council election
 2007 West Wiltshire Council election
 2007 Weymouth and Portland Council election
 2007 Winchester Council election
 2007 Windsor and Maidenhead Council election
 2007 Wirral Council election
 2007 Woking Council election
 2007 Wokingham Council election
 2007 Wolverhampton Council election
 2007 Worcester Council election
 2007 Worthing Council election
 2007 Wyre Forest Council election
 2007 York Council election

Scottish local
 2007 Scottish local elections
 2003 Scottish local elections
 2007 Aberdeen City Council election
 2007 Aberdeenshire Council election
 2007 Angus Council election
 2007 Argyll and Bute Council election
 2007 City of Edinburgh Council election
 2007 Clackmannanshire Council election
 2007 Comhairle nan Eilean Siar election
 2007 Dumfries and Galloway Council election
 2007 Dundee City Council election
 2007 East Ayrshire Council election
 2007 East Dunbartonshire Council election
 2007 East Lothian Council election
 2007 East Renfrewshire Council election
 2007 Falkirk Council election
 2007 Fife Council election
 2007 Glasgow City Council election
 2007 Midlothian Council election
 2007 North Ayrshire Council election
 2007 North Lanarkshire Council election
 2007 Orkney Islands Council election
 2007 Perth and Kinross Council election
 2007 Renfrewshire Council election
 2007 Scottish Borders Council election
 2007 Shetland Islands Council election
 2007 South Ayrshire Council election
 2007 South Lanarkshire Council election
 2007 Stirling Council election
 2007 Highland Council election
 2007 West Dunbartonshire Council election
 2007 West Lothian Council election

National Assembly for Wales
 2007 National Assembly for Wales election
 One Wales

North America
 2007 Costa Rican Dominican Republic – Central America Free Trade Agreement referendum
 2007 Guatemalan general election

Canada
 Canadian electoral calendar, 2007
 2007 Alberta provincial by-elections
 2007 Belfast-Murray River provincial by-election
 2007 Canadian federal by-elections
 2007 Charlevoix provincial by-election
 2007 Cole Harbour-Eastern Passage provincial by-election
 Commission scolaire de la Région-de-Sherbrooke election, 2007
 Commission scolaire du Val-des-Cerfs election, 2007
 2007 Green Party of British Columbia leadership election
 2007 Manitoba general election
 2007 Moncton East provincial by-election
 2007 New Brunswick New Democratic Party leadership election
 2007 Newfoundland and Labrador general election
 2007 Newfoundland and Labrador provincial by-elections
 2007 Northwest Territories general election
 2007 Nova Scotia Liberal Party leadership election
 2007 Ontario electoral reform referendum
 Ontario electoral reform referendum, 2007 detailed results
 2007 Ontario provincial by-elections
 2007 Parti Québécois leadership election
 2007 Prince Edward Island general election
 2007 Quebec general election
 2007 Saint John, New Brunswick ward plebiscite
 2007 Saskatchewan general election

Alberta municipal
 2007 Alberta municipal elections
 2007 Calgary municipal election
 2007 Edmonton municipal election
 2007 Grande Prairie municipal election
 2007 Lethbridge municipal election
 2007 Medicine Hat municipal election
 2007 Red Deer municipal election
 2007 Slave Lake municipal election
 2007 Spruce Grove municipal election
 2007 Wood Buffalo municipal election

Ontario general
 2007 Ontario general election
 Green Party of Ontario candidates, 2007 Ontario provincial election
 Ontario Liberal Party candidates, 2007 Ontario provincial election
 Ontario New Democratic Party candidates, 2007 Ontario provincial election
 Ontario general election, 2007 (results)
 Progressive Conservative Party of Ontario candidates, 2007 Ontario provincial election

Caribbean
 2007 Bahamian general election
 2007 Bermudan general election
 2007 British Virgin Islands general election
 2007 Costa Rican Dominican Republic – Central America Free Trade Agreement referendum
 2007 Cuban local elections
 2007 Jamaican general election
 2007 Saint Martin Territorial Council election
 2007 Trinidad and Tobago general election
 2007 Turks and Caicos Islands general election
 2007 United States Virgin Islands Constitutional Convention election

United States Virgin Islands
 2007 United States Virgin Islands Constitutional Convention election

Mexico
 2007 Mexican elections
 2007 Baja California state election
 Broad Progressive Front
 2007 Yucatán state election

United States
 2007 United States elections
 2007 Kentucky state elections
 2007 Louisiana state elections
 2007 Mississippi general election
 2007 Northern Mariana Islands general election
 2007 Oregon's statewide elections
 2007 Pennsylvania state elections
 2007 Virginia state elections

United States House of Representatives
 2007 California's 37th congressional district special election
 2007 Georgia's 10th congressional district special election
 2007 Massachusetts's 5th congressional district special election
 2007 Ohio's 5th congressional district special election
 2007 Virginia's 1st congressional district special election

United States Senate
 2007 Georgia's 24th state senate district special election

United States gubernatorial
 2007 United States gubernatorial elections
 2007 Kentucky gubernatorial election
 2007 Louisiana gubernatorial election
 2007 Mississippi gubernatorial election

United States mayoral
 2007 United States mayoral elections
 2007 Baltimore mayoral election
 2007 Charlotte mayoral election
 2007 Houston mayoral election
 2007 Houston elections
 2007 Indianapolis mayoral election
 2007 Jacksonville mayoral election
 2007 Philadelphia mayoral election
 2007 Pittsburgh mayoral special election
 2007 Raleigh mayoral election
 2007 San Francisco mayoral election
 November 2007 San Francisco general elections
 Juneau, Alaska, regular election, 2007
 Juneau, Alaska, special election, 2007

Constitutional
 2007 Texas constitutional amendment election
 2007 United States Virgin Islands Constitutional Convention election

Washington (U.S. state)
 Washington Initiative 957 (2007)
 Washington Initiative 960 (2007)
 Washington Referendum 67 (2007)

United States Virgin Islands
 2007 United States Virgin Islands Constitutional Convention election

Oceania
 2007 Kiribati parliamentary election
 2007 Kiribati presidential election
 2007 Marshall Islands general election
 2007 Micronesian parliamentary election
 2007 Micronesian presidential election
 2007 Nauruan parliamentary election
 2007 Nauruan presidential election
 2007 New Zealand local elections
 2007 Northern Mariana Islands general election
 2007 Papua New Guinean general election
 2007 Pitcairn Islands general election
 2007 Samoan o le Ao o le Malo election
 2007 Titikaveka by-election
 2007 Tokelauan self-determination referendum
 2007 Vaimauga West by-election
 2007 Wallis and Futuna Territorial Assembly election

Australia

Federal
 2007 Australian federal election
 2007 House of Representatives results for the Australian federal election
 2007 Senate results for the Australian federal election
 Mackerras federal election pendulum, 2006
 Post-election pendulum for the 2007 Australian federal election
 Liberal Party of Australia leadership spill, 2007
 National Party of Australia leadership spill, 2007

New South Wales
 2007 New South Wales state election
 New South Wales state election campaign, 2007

Northern Territory
 2007 Greatorex by-election

Queensland
 2007 Brisbane Central state by-election
 2007 Queensland Local Government Area amalgamation plebiscites

Victoria
 2007 Albert Park state by-election
 2007 Williamstown state by-election

Western Australia
 2007 Peel state by-election

New Zealand
 2007 Dunedin mayoral election
 2007 New Zealand local elections
 2007 Wellington City mayoral election

Northern Mariana Islands
 2007 Northern Mariana Islands general election

South America
 2007 Argentine general election
 2007 Colombian regional elections
 2007 Ecuadorian Constituent Assembly election
 2007 Ecuadorian Constituent Assembly referendum
 2007 Venezuelan constitutional referendum

See also

 
2007
Elections